Juncaginaceae is a family of flowering plants, recognized by most taxonomists for the past few decades.  It is also known as the arrowgrass family. It includes 3 genera with a total of 34 known species (Christenhusz & Byng 2016 ).

The APG II system, of 2003 (unchanged from the APG system, of 1998), also recognizes such a family and places it in the order Alismatales, in the clade monocots. The species are found in cold or temperate regions in both the Northern and Southern Hemisphere. However APG IV (2016) removed the genus Maundia due to its non-exclusive relationship, and elevated it to the monogeneric family Maundiaceae.

Description

Juncaginaceae are marsh or aquatic herbs with linear, sheathing basal leaves. The flowers are small and green in erect spikes or racemes.  The flower parts come in threes, but the carpels are either 3 or 6, joined to a superior ovary. The fruit is a capsule. 
Example arrowgrasses Triglochin include the Marsh Arrowgrass (Triglochin palustris), the Sea Arrowgrass (Triglochin maritima), and also other species like Triglochin trichophora, Triglochin striata and Triglochin mucronata.

Taxonomy
The genus Maundia was placed within the family Juncaginaceae by the APG II. The newer APG III version (2009), though, suggested it may be necessary to split Maundia off into its own monogeneric family, Maundiaceae, supported by the non-exclusive relationship of the genus to Juncaginaceae. This was achieved in the APG IV (2016), leaving only four genera in Juncaginaceae.

References

Bibliography

 
 
 , in 
 
 , in

External links
 
 Juncaginaceae in L. Watson and M.J. Dallwitz (1992 onwards). The families of flowering plants: descriptions, illustrations, identification, information retrieval. Version: 9 March 2006. http://delta-intkey.com
 Juncaginaceae in the Flora of North America
 NCBI Taxonomy browser
 links at CSDL, Texas
 Juncaginaceae of Mongolia in FloraGREIF

 
Alismatales families
Aquatic plants